Prasiolopsis is a genus of green algae in the family Prasiolaceae.

References

External links

Prasiolales
Trebouxiophyceae genera